KGRS (107.3 FM) is a commercial radio station that serves the Burlington, Iowa area.  The station broadcasts a hot adult contemporary format.  KGRS is licensed to Titan Broadcasting, LLC, which is owned by John C. "LJ" Pritchard.

Titan Broadcasting LLC agreed to purchase the station from GAP West (owned by Skip Weller) in late 2007.  The station was owned by Clear Channel prior to GAP West.  Titan also owns KBKB-FM in nearby Fort Madison, Iowa.

The transmitter and broadcast tower are located in Burlington near the intersection of U.S. Route 61 and U.S. Route 34.

References

External links
KGRS website

GRS
Burlington, Iowa
1968 establishments in Iowa
Radio stations established in 1968